The Ateneo de Manila University Press is a university press and the official publishing house of Ateneo de Manila University in the Philippines.

The Ateneo University Press was established in 1972 and operates as an auxiliary unit in the university's structure.

Awards
The Ateneo de Manila University Press was named Publisher of the Year by the National Book Awards from 2017 to 2019. It topped the Aklatan, an all-Filipino online book fair, in 2020.

In 2016, the Ateneo University Press launched 21 new publications in Harvest 2016.

References

External links
 
Facebook Page

Ateneo de Manila University
University presses of the Philippines
Publishing companies established in 1972
Book publishing companies of the Philippines
Companies based in Quezon City